Navneet Kaur Rana (also known as Navneet Ravi Rana) is a former Indian actress who mainly acted in Telugu cinema. She is an elected Member of Parliament (MP) from Amravati in 2019 Lok Sabha elections as an independent candidate.

Film career
Kaur was born and brought up in Mumbai, Maharashtra, India. Her parents are of Punjabi origin of Ravidassia Caste; her father was an army official. She completed her studies up to 10th standard in Karthika High School. After finishing 12th class, she discontinued her education and began working as a model, going on to appear in six music videos. Kaur made her feature film debut in Darshan, a Kannada film. Then followed her debut in Telugu with Seenu Vasanthi Lakshmi (2004). Chetna (2005), Jagapathi (2005), Good Boy (2005), and Bhuma (2008) are some of her subsequent releases. Additional work include Kalachakram, Terror, Flash News and Jabilamma which was remake of Hindi film Chameli in Telugu. She was a contestant in the Gemini TV reality show named Humma Humma. She starred in the Malayalam film Love In Singapore, directed by Rafi Mecartin. In 2010, she acted in the Punjabi film Lad Geya Pecha opposite Gurpreet Ghuggi.

Political career
After the marriage with Ravi Rana, she tried her career as a politician in 2014 Lok Sabha Election from Nationalist Congress Party however lost the election; citing the reason for the loss she stated that her competition was indirectly Narendra Modi, who had rallied for the then winning candidate, Anandrao Adsul.

She was elected as an MP from Amravati, Maharashtra constituency in Lok Sabha Elections 2019 as an Independent candidate, with support of Indian National Congress and Nationalist Congress Party defeating Anandrao Adsul of Shiv Sena. In this election as an independent candidate, she has spent Rs.65 Lakh while the previous two times MP, Adsul has spent Rs.49 Lakh for a democratic process. Her win is considered as a huge victory of an independent candidate in Shiv Sena's neglected fortress in Vidarbha.

On various level (i.e. local, regional and national; in public or, in various institutions like Lok Sabha) she is seen to have altercation with Shiv Sena and its party members time-to-time.

Controversy 
On 8 June 2021, the High Court of Bombay fined her Rs. 2 lakh, for submitting a fake Mochi caste certificate. The court cancelled her caste certificate, however, it remained silent on the validity of her position as an elected representative from a Lok Sabha seat reserved for people belonging to Scheduled Caste category. In April 2022, Kaur and her husband Ravi were arrested by Mumbai police following their insistence to recite Hanuman Chalisa in front of Matoshree the residence of former Maharashtra CM Uddhav Thackeray. Later they were sent to 14 days of judicial custody, where Rana was sent to the Byculla women's jail on the orders of local magistrate.

Personal life
After a short hiatus from her film career, on 3 February 2011, she married Ravi Rana, an independent MLA from Badnera constituency in Amravati city. It has been reported that they got married along with a mass marriage ceremony where many leaders and VIPs, including the then Chief Minister of Maharashtra Prithviraj Chavan and Baba Ramdev, remained present to bless the newly wedded couple.

Filmography

References

External links
 Profile on Lok Sabha website
 
 
 
 

Living people
1986 births
Actresses from Mumbai
Indian Sikhs
Punjabi people
Indian film actresses
Actresses in Tamil cinema
Actresses in Telugu cinema
Actresses in Kannada cinema
Actresses in Malayalam cinema
Actresses in Hindi cinema
Actresses in Punjabi cinema
Politicians from Mumbai
Maharashtra politicians
Women in Maharashtra politics
Dalit politicians
Indian actor-politicians
Punjabi politicians
United Progressive Alliance candidates in the 2014 Indian general election
Nationalist Congress Party politicians from Maharashtra
Independent politicians in India
India MPs 2019–present
Women members of the Lok Sabha
Indian prisoners and detainees
21st-century Indian actresses
21st-century Indian politicians
21st-century Indian women politicians